The American Jazz Museum is located in the historic 18th and Vine district of Kansas City, Missouri. The museum preserves the history of American jazz music, with exhibits on Charlie Parker, Duke Ellington, Louis Armstrong, Ella Fitzgerald and others. Nested within the museum is a fully functioning jazz club, The Blue Room, which holds live performances multiple nights a week.

Collections 
One of the significant items on display is the Graphon alto saxophone played by Charlie Parker at the famous January, 1953 Massey Hall concert in Toronto with Max Roach, Dizzy Gillespie, Charles Mingus and Bud Powell.  In addition to the many historical exhibits visitors can learn about different styles and rhythms of  jazz at the multiple listening station exhibits. Another major component of the museum is the historic Gem Theatre directly across 18th Street. The museum is a Smithsonian Affiliate.

The Blue Room 

The museum includes an exhibit of a working jazz club, designed to look like a 1930s nightclub and named after the Street Hotel's Blue Room, which was famous in the 1930s and 1940s in the segregated district. During that era, jazz clubs were open 24 hours a day. The Museum's Blue Room has interactive exhibits, a bar, and hosts live performances multiple evenings every week. The entrance to the Blue Room is directly at the corner of 18th & Vine streets.

Youth programs 
The museum runs youth cultural programs.

History 
The museum opened in 1997 and is in a building that also houses the Negro Leagues Baseball Museum.

Budget crisis 
Since 2017, the museum has been addressing a budget crisis. The museum received a bailout from the city to cover a budget shortfall of $445,872 from the cost of the May 2017 Kansas City Jazz & Heritage Festival. As of 2017, the City Council is reviewing a proposal to transfer the oversight of the museum to the Kansas City Parks and Recreation Department by spring 2018.

In April 2018, Museum Management Consultants produced a report that recommended the museum refresh staff and board members, and temporarily close to regroup.  The recommendation to close has been widely criticized by both the city and the Museum.  As a result of the report, the Museum's Director, Cheptoo Kositany-Buckner, agreed to step down in May 2018 after serving as the director since January 2016.  The Board downsized from 23 members to eight.

See also
 List of points of interest in Kansas City, Missouri
 Kansas City jazz
 List of music museums

References

External links

 
 American Jazz Museum feature. The Local Show (season 4, episode 2), PBS. Aired 18 July 2013, retrieved 5 March 2018.
 The Street Hotel and the Blue Room photographic archives at Black Archive
 18th and Vine photographic archives at Black Archive

Jazz organizations
Museums in Kansas City, Missouri
Music museums in the United States
History museums in Missouri
Smithsonian Institution affiliates